The Santiago Island League was a regional championship played in all of Santiago Island until 2002 when it was broken up into two present divisions, the North and the South zones, Cape Verde.  It formed a part of the Santiago Regional Football Association (Associação Regional de Futebol de Santiago, ARFS) The winner of the championship had played in Cape Verdean football Championships of each season.

The island league was one of the two oldest in Cape Verde.  Until the 1960s, the league included clubs from the entire southern portion of Cape Verde and functioned as a regional league.

From 2000 to 2002, it only contained a single match where as the champion  of the South Zone competed with the North Zone and qualified into the National Championships.  From 2002, it received separate qualification of the North and South Zones. Though, the island championship returned in 2009 for a season, it featured a single match with the winner of the North and South Zones competing for the single island championship (without qualification as the North and South Zones qualified separately), Académica da Praia won the championship.

Up to 2002, no association used the abbreviative form of ARFS other than the island of Santiago, Sal Regional Football Association's Portuguese language abbreviative form was read as ARFSL.

Winners

Before independence
1953: Vitória
1954: CD Travadores
1955-1959 : unknown
1959/60 : CD Travadores
1960/61 : Sporting Clube da Praia
1961/62 : unknown
1962/63 : Boavista
1963/64 : Sporting Clube da Praia
1964/65 : Académica (Praia)
1965/66 : unknown
1966/67 : CD Travadores
1967/68 : Académica (Praia)
1968/69 : Sporting Clube da Praia
1969/70: CD Travadores?
1970/71 : unknown
1971/72 : CD Travadores
1972/73 : Vitória
1973/74 : Sporting Clube da Praia
1974/75 : unknown

Performance By Club

After independence
1975/76 : Boavista FC
1976/77 : Sporting Clube da Praia
1977/78: Sporting Clube da Praia
1979-82 : unknown
1982/83: Boavista FC
1983/84: Sporting Clube da Praia
1984/85 : Sporting Clube da Praia
1985-86 : unknown
1986/87 : Boavista FC
1987/88 : Sporting Clube da Praia
1988/89 : Académica (Praia)
1989/90 : Desportivo da Praia
1990/91 : Sporting Clube da Praia
1991/92 : CD Travadores
1992/93 : Boavista FC
1993/94 : CD Travadores
1994/95 : Boavista FC
1995/96 : CD Travadores
1996/97 : Sporting Clube da Praia
1997/98 : Sporting Clube da Praia
1998/99   not held
1999/00 : CD Travadores
2000/01   not held
2002 : Sporting Clube da Praia defeated Desportivo de Santa Cruz
2009: Académica da Praia defeated Scorpion Vermelho of the North Zone

Performance By Club

After the first full break up to the single island competitions
The next meeting between a club from the north and the South Zone would be the 2006 Cape Verdean Football Championships between Sporting Praia and Beira-Mar on June 3. As Sporting won a national title, two clubs from the South Zone competed, one of them challenged a North Zone club, in 2007, Académica Praia defeated Scorpion Vermelho on June 24 of Group B, in 2008, it was ADESBA and Scorpion Vermelho at Round 2 of Group B., in 2009, it was Sporting and Estrela dos Amadores at Round 5 of Group B, in 2010 it was Sporting Praia and Scorpion Vermelho at the last round of Group B, in 2011, it was Sporting Praia and Benfica Santa Cruz of the first round of Group A, in 2012, it was Sporting Praia and Estrela dos Amadores at the last round of Group A, in 2013, it was Sporting Praia and Scorpion Vermelho at the last round in Group B, in 2014, it was Sporting Praia and Grémio Nhagar at the fourth round in Group A, in 2015, it was Boavista Praia and Beira-Mar Tarrafal at the first round of Group A and in 2016, the last official meeting was Desportivo da Praia and Varandinha Tarrafal, at the first round of Group A in a rescheduled match which was played on June 1.

The 2017 featured three groups, unlike Santo Antão who played in the same group, Group B, the two participants from the island played in two different groups.

Their recent meeting was a friendly competition at the GAFT Cup with the last being Benfica de Santa Cruz and Desportivo da Praia.

See also
Praia Cup, sometimes as the Santiago Cup, as there was another competition titled the Praia Cup, the common name was the Santiago Cup or the Santiago Island Cup
Sports in Santiago, Cape Verde

Football competitions in Cape Verde
Sport in Santiago, Cape Verde
1953 establishments in Cape Verde
Sports leagues established in 1953